A soma holiday is a catatonic, drug-induced state of mind in Aldous Huxley's Brave New World, but may also refer to:
 Soma Holiday (the Proletariat album), 1983 album by the Proletariat
 Soma Holiday (Greenwheel album), 2002 album by Greenwheel